Ardisia microcalyx is a species of plant in the family Primulaceae. It is endemic to Panama.  It is threatened by habitat loss.

References

Endemic flora of Panama
microcalyx
Endangered plants
Taxonomy articles created by Polbot